TRPG may refer to:

 Tactical role-playing game
 Tabletop role-playing game
 John A. Osborne Airport (ICAO code TRPG)